The 2019 Italian government crisis was a political event in Italy that occurred between August and September 2019. It includes the events that follow the announcement of the Minister of the Interior and leader of the League, Matteo Salvini, that he would revoke League's support of the cabinet and ask the President of the Republic to call a snap election. This provoked the resignation of Prime Minister Giuseppe Conte, and resulted in the formation of a new cabinet led by Conte himself.

Background

In the 2018 Italian general election, no political group or party won an outright majority, resulting in a hung parliament. On 4 March, the centre-right alliance, in which Matteo Salvini's League emerged as the main political force, won a plurality of seats in the Chamber of Deputies and in the Senate, while the anti-establishment Five Star Movement (M5S) led by Luigi Di Maio became the party with the largest number of votes.  The centre-left coalition, led by Matteo Renzi, came third. As a result, protracted negotiations were required before a new government could be formed.

The talks between the Five Star Movement and the League resulted in the proposal of the so-called "government of change" under the leadership of university professor Giuseppe Conte, a law professor close to the M5S. After some dispute with President Sergio Mattarella, Conte's cabinet, which was dubbed by the media as Western Europe's "first all-populist government", was sworn in on 1 June.

Political crisis
In August 2019, Deputy Prime Minister Salvini announced a motion of no confidence against Conte, after growing tensions within the majority. Salvini's move came right after a vote in the Senate regarding the progress of the Turin–Lyon high-speed railway, in which the Lega voted against an attempt of the M5S to block the construction works. Many political analysts believe the no confidence motion was an attempt to force early elections to improve Lega's standing in Parliament, ensuring Salvini could become the next Prime Minister. On 20 August, following the parliamentary debate in which Conte harshly accused Salvini of being a political opportunist who "had triggered the political crisis only to serve his personal interest", the Prime Minister resigned his post to President Sergio Mattarella.

Government formation

On 21 August, Mattarella started the consultations with all the parliamentary groups. On the same day, the national direction of the Democratic Party (PD) officially opened to a cabinet with the Five Star Movement, based on pro-Europeanism, green economy, sustainable development, fight against economic inequality and a new immigration policy. However, the talks with President Mattarella resulted in an unclear outcome, thus Mattarella announced a second round of consultation for 27 or 28 August.

In days that preceded the second round, a confrontation between PD and M5S started, while the left-wing Free and Equal (LeU) announced that they would support a potential M5S–PD cabinet. On 28 August, PD's leader Nicola Zingaretti announced at the Quirinal Palace his favorable position on forming a new government with the Five Stars with Giuseppe Conte at its head. On the same day, Mattarella summoned Conte to the Quirinal Palace for the 29 August to give him the task of forming a new cabinet.

Approval by M5S membership
On 1 September, Five Star's founder Beppe Grillo strongly endorsed an alliance with the PD, describing it as a "unique occasion" to reform the country. After two days, on 3 September, the members of the Five Star Movement voted on the so-called "Rousseau Platform" in favor of an agreement with the Democrats, under the premiership of Giuseppe Conte, with more than 79% of votes out of nearly 80,000 voters.

Investiture votes 
On 9 September 2019 the Chamber of Deputies granted the confidence to the government with 343 votes in favour, 263 against and 3 abstentions. On the following day the confidence was confirmed in the Senate with 169 votes in favor and 133 against.

Reactions 

 European Commission President Jean Claude Juncker sent a letter of congratulations to Giuseppe Conte, adding "I am convinced that Italy will be able to play an important role in addressing European challenges".
 European Commission vice-president Frans Timmermans said that the Conte II cabinet is "good for Europe" and he "can't wait, really, to work with the new government".
 European Central Bank president nominee Christine Lagarde praised the candidacy of Roberto Gualtieri as Minister of Economy and Finance, adding it would be "good for Italy and Europe" 
 European Commissioner for Economic and Financial Affairs, Taxation and Customs Pierre Moscovici congratulated Roberto Gualtieri for being appointed as Minister of Economy and Finance: "Looking forward to seeing you in Helsinki and to working closely with you in the coming weeks."
 European Parliament president David Sassoli tweeted "Italy’s stability is of importance to the EU. I wish the new government the best and look forward to meeting them in Brussels."
 European Parliament president of the Progressive Alliance of Socialists and Democrats Iratxe García cheered the new government "that places Italy back at the table of those willing to build a stronger and reformed Europe".

 President of the United States Donald Trump, during the days the two parties were looking for an agreement, praised Giuseppe Conte and hoped he would "hopefully remain Prime Minister".

See also

 2018 Italian government formation
 2008 Italian political crisis
 2021 Italian government crisis
 2022 Italian government crisis

References

Government crisis
Government crisis
Government crises
2019 government crisis
Giuseppe Conte